Kilcavan is a townland in South Wicklow approximately 5 Kilometres north-east of Carnew. The area is located at the southern end of the Wicklow Mountains.

History

Over the centuries, the land of Kilcavan attracted people because of its rolling hills, fertile soil, and slate quarry. The original mention of the name Kilcavan was first noted shortly after County Wicklow was established in 1606. In 1608, the first mention of Killkavane was made. Other notes of this townland were referred in 1636 as Kilkevine, in 1655 as Bearnkilkeavan, 1660 as Killcavan, 1668 Kilcavin, in 1760 as Killkevin. The specific area in Kilcavan previously known as Bearnkilkeavan is now called Kilcavan Gap.

In the nineteenth century the area was in the control of Lord Fitzwilliam and was originally leased to only Protestants. This changed after 1808, and Catholics were given the chance to get leases from Lord Fitzwilliam.

Kilcavan Church
On the R748 road between Carnew and the Kilcavan Gap, there is a field with many granite stones. This land is in Kilcavan Upper and is privately owned today. This was once the site of an early religious settlement known as Kilcavan Church.  Very little is known of this church, but it is believed to have been a circular shaped building (according to the 1838 Ordnance Survey map), and is also believed to have contained a cemetery.  Today there is very little left of the Church except scattered granite stones, some resembling grave stones, others most likely church building material.

Kilcavan Church was named after Saint Cill Chaoimhgin, who founded the monastery of Airdne Coemain, now Ardcavan, County Wexford, in 548-9.  Cill Chaoimhgin is apparently the same priest named Caeman of Dairinis in other sources, which Saint Finnian of Clonard, visited before he went to Aghowle.  So the connection with Saint Finnian makes it probable that Cill Chaoimhgin is the correct form of this name, which translates from the Gaelic language to Kilcavan.

Kilcavan Quarries

From 1800 to 1941, the Slate Quarries of Kilcavan provided many labor jobs and was a source of employment for many local inhabitants. Although this slate was mainly exported, it was also used locally and throughout Ireland. There is some evidence to suggest that the quarry was producing slate much further back than the officially recognized date of 1800. The quarry was officially closed in 1941.

In those days, slate was used for many types of building materials and also produced a byproduct called "Inner Tight", which was a fine powder rock that was used as a base for battleship paint. Kilcavan quarry produced a black/dark grey slate.  

In the years that the quarry was open it attracted many people to this part of County Wicklow and provided steady work during the times of famine.

Agriculture

The geography of Kilcavan was highly conducive to agriculture, tilling, grazing and farming in the nineteenth century and even in the present day, the area is dominated by agriculture.

References 

Wicklow (town)
Former populated places in Ireland
History of County Wicklow